Lenny Brad Walls (born September 26, 1979) is a former professional American and Canadian football defensive back. He last played for the Edmonton Eskimos of the Canadian Football League. He was signed by the Denver Broncos as an undrafted free agent in 2002. He played college football for the Boston College Eagles.

Walls has also been a member of the Kansas City Chiefs, St. Louis Rams, Baltimore Ravens and Calgary Stampeders. He helped the Stampeders win the 2008 Grey Cup.

College career
After graduating from Galileo High School at San Francisco in 1997, Walls attended St. Mary's College of California and transferred to the City College of San Francisco then to Boston College. He played in 21 games for the Eagles and recorded 84 tackles, four sacks, nine interception and 17 pass breakups. At the City College of San Francisco he won a junior college championship and was a teammate of quarterback Nick Rolovich.

Professional career

Denver Broncos
Walls signed with the Denver Broncos after going undrafted in the 2002 NFL Draft. After his signing, Walls became the tallest cornerback in the NFL at 6'4". He played in 13 games as a rookie in 2002 and recorded six tackles all on special teams. His only defensive appearance came against Baltimore, however his only stats of the game came on special teams with two tackles. His first  forced fumble was against the St. Louis Rams.

In 2003, Walls started all 16 games and ranked fifth on Denver with 68 tackles and led the team with 20 pass breakups. His 20 pass breakups were the most in Denver history since Ray Crockett had 21 in 1997. Against San Diego he had six tackles while against Cincinnati he had five tackles and three pass breakups. In the AFC Wildcard game he recorded three tackles and a forced fumble.

In 2004, Walls played in seven games and had 21 tackles along with two pass breakups. He was later placed on injured reserve with a shoulder injury. In his season debut on September 12, he recorded four tackles before suffering the shoulder injury. After the injury, he played sporadically, either missing whole games or leaving in the fourth quarter or earlier.

In his final season in Denver, Walls had 16 tackles in seven games, with his final appearance as a Bronco coming against the New York Giants on October 23, 2005. He was placed on injured reserve with a groin injury on November 5, 2005.

Kansas City Chiefs
Walls signed a one-year deal worth $1.75 million with the Kansas City Chiefs on April 1, 2006. He played in all of the Chiefs 16 games and started two. In his 16 games he had 29 tackles. After the 2006 season his contract expired and he was not re-signed.

St. Louis Rams
On April 4, 2007, he signed with the St. Louis Rams as an unrestricted free agent. Walls played in five games and recorded nine tackles. He was waived on October 12, 2007.

Baltimore Ravens
Walls signed with the Baltimore Ravens on May 20, 2008. He was released at the end of training camp.

Calgary Stampeders
Walls signed with the Calgary Stampeders on September 22, 2008. His first two weeks with Calgary were spent on the practice roster before being activated and starting against the Saskatchewan Roughriders on October 13. Against the Roughriders he led the Stampeders with nine tackles and recorded his first interception in the CFL. After his debut in Calgary, he started every game for the rest of the year. In all of his starts with the Stampeders he got multiple tackles. He ended up with 23 tackles on the year but missed the playoffs including Calgary's 96th Grey Cup victory with an injury.

Winnipeg Blue Bombers
On May 15, 2009, Walls was traded to the Winnipeg Blue Bombers.

Edmonton Eskimos
After one season in Winnipeg, Walls signed as a free agent with the Eskimos on March 22, 2010. He was released during the following off-season on May 27, 2011.

References

External links

1979 births
Living people
American football cornerbacks
American players of Canadian football
Baltimore Ravens players
Boston College Eagles football players
Calgary Stampeders players
Canadian football defensive backs
Denver Broncos players
Edmonton Elks players
City College of San Francisco Rams football players
Kansas City Chiefs players
Players of American football from San Francisco
Players of Canadian football from San Francisco
St. Louis Rams players
Winnipeg Blue Bombers players